The 2020 V.League 1 season (or LS V.League 1 2020 for sponsorship reasons) was the 64th season of the V.League 1, the highest division of Football in Vietnam. 

Due to the COVID-19 pandemic, the schedule had been changed to begin on 7 March instead of 21 February as originally planned. All matches in matchdays 1 and 2 were played behind closed doors due to the same reason. Following the stabilizing situation, the league resumed in June, and also became the first league to allow fans into the stadium post-COVID-19 outbreak. On 26 July 2020, the league was suspended again due to another surge in COVID-19 cases.

Changes from last season

Team changes
The following teams have changed division since the 2019 season.

To V.League 1

Promoted from V.League 2
 Hong Linh Ha Tinh

From V.League 1
Relegated to V.League 2
 Sanna Khanh Hoa BVN

Rules changes

In the 2020 season, each team could register 3+1 foreign players (3 foreign + 1 naturalized Vietnamese). The teams that participated in ASEAN Club Championship and AFC Cup (Ho Chi Minh City, Hanoi, Than Quang Ninh) could register 3+1+1 foreign players (3 foreign + 1 naturalized Vietnamese + 1 AFC player)

On 13 May 2020, the format had been slightly changed, including:
 The 1st leg will remain unchanged.
 After the 1st leg, teams will be split into 2 groups:
 Championship group (Group A) will include the top 8 teams in the 1st leg.
 Relegation group (Group B) will include the bottom 6 teams in the 1st leg.
 Each group will play another single round-robin format. After the end of season:
 The champions will qualify for the 2021 AFC Champions League group stage.
 The runners-up and the cup winners, Hanoi (or the league 3rd-placers if Hanoi qualified for AFC Club Competitions through league performance) will qualify for the 2021 AFC Cup group stage.
 The 14th-ranked team will be relegated to 2021 V.League 2. There's no relegation playoff for this season. and the 13th-ranked team will stay in V.League 1 2021.

Teams

Personnel and kits

Managerial changes

Foreign players
Players name in bold indicates the player is registered during the mid-season transfer window.

 Naturalized players whose parents or grandparents were born in Vietnam, thus are regarded as local players.

Phase 1 League table

Phase 2 League Table

Championship Group

Relegation Group

Results

Positions by round
This table lists the positions of teams after each week of matches. In order to preserve the chronological evolution, any postponed matches are not included to the round at which they were originally scheduled, but added to the full round they were played immediately afterwards. For example, if a match is scheduled for matchday 13, but then postponed and played between days 16 and 17, it will be added to the standings for day 16.

Championship round

Relegation round

Season progress

Schedule 
Details (in Vietnamese): https://vpf.vn/tai-lieu-vleague/vleague-thong-bao/lich-thi-dau-giai-vdqg-ls-2020/

Attendances

By club

By round 

 Due to concerns about the COVID-19 epidemic, all 14 matches in the first 2 rounds were played without spectators.

Season statistics

Top scorers

See also
 2020 V.League 2
 2020 Vietnamese National Football Second League
 2020 Vietnamese National Football Third League

References

Vietnamese Super League seasons
Vietnam
2020 in Vietnamese football
V.League 1